Highway 787 is a provincial highway in the Canadian province of Saskatchewan. It runs from Highway 29 to the Senlac Access Road near Senlac. Highway 787 is about 100 km (62 mi.) long.

Highway 787 also passes near the communities of Cloan, Swarthmore, Winter, and Rutland.

Highway 787 connects with Highways 21 and 675.

See also 
Roads in Saskatchewan
Transportation in Saskatchewan

References 

787